Pedro the Lion is an American indie rock band from Seattle, Washington, United States. David Bazan formed the band in 1995 and represented its main creative force, backed by a varying rotation of collaborating musicians. In 2006 Pedro the Lion was dissolved as Bazan went solo; Bazan reformed the band and resumed performing under the Pedro the Lion moniker in late 2017. Releasing five full-length albums and five EPs over 11 years, the band is known for its first person narrative lyrics with political and religious themes.

History 
Pedro the Lion was formed by David Bazan in 1995. The name of the band comes from a character that would have been interwoven into the band's first album. In 1997 they released their debut EP Whole with Bazan playing nearly every instrument, a format he continued on the band's first two full-length albums, It's Hard to Find a Friend (1998), and Winners Never Quit (2000).

Winners marked Pedro the Lion's first concept album.  After its completion, Bazan has claimed he initially decided not to continue writing concept albums.  However, in the process of writing his next full-length Control, he realized he had inadvertently created a narrative link "about 70% of the way through [the album]" and decided to finish it in the same vein.  The album's thematic content criticizes American capitalism, which Bazan notes was largely inspired by the sentiments surrounding the World Trade Organization protests in 1999.

Control also saw Casey Foubert of Seattle-based Seldom join Pedro the Lion to play bass on the album. Additionally, he co-wrote "Penetration" and "Second Best", the third and eighth tracks, respectively, on the album, which was released in 2002.

Achilles Heel followed, released on May 24, 2004, and marked the beginning of Bazan's partnership with TW Walsh as the band's primary writers and musicians.  Bazan described the tracks in the fourth full-length from Pedro the Lion as a return to the songwriting characterized by Friend and the Secure EP in the sense that there was no "pretense of anything bigger", an allusion to his previous concept albums.

In early January 2006, Pedro the Lion formally announced that they had split. The split was amicable; Bazan and Walsh continue to be good friends. Bazan said that their friendship has even been strengthened by the breakup.  Bazan toured in support of Fewer Moving Parts, his solo debut EP. Walsh returned to his career as a Web application developer and is busy with his band, The Soft Drugs, and their debut release, In Moderation.  David Bazan released his debut solo LP, Curse Your Branches, on Seattle-based Barsuk Records in 2009.

The Pedro The Lion catalog was remastered for vinyl by TW Walsh and reissued in 2012.

Bazan is a member of Overseas with Will Johnson of  Centro-matic and Bubba & Matt Kadane of Bedhead and The New Year. Their self-titled debut album was released on June 11, 2013.

Beginning in spring 2017, Bazan began forming a new band which he initially envisioned billing as "David Bazan Band" or something similar.  In October 2017, Bazan announced that Pedro the Lion would be reforming beginning with several shows in December 2017. Asked if there would be new material Bazan explained that the band will initially be playing Pedro the Lion's existing catalog along with limited performances of songs from Headphones and Bazan's solo catalog, with new material to follow.

Discography

Albums 
It's Hard to Find a Friend – Made In Mexico/Jade Tree – 1998
Winners Never Quit – Jade Tree – 2000
Control – Jade Tree – 2002
Achilles Heel – Jade Tree – 2004
Phoenix – Polyvinyl and Big Scary Monsters – 2019
Havasu – Polyvinyl and Big Scary Monsters – 2022

EPs 
Whole EP – Tooth & Nail – 1997
The Only Reason I Feel Secure – Made In Mexico / Jade Tree – 1999
Progress – Suicide Squeeze – 2000
Tour EP '04 – Self-released / Jade Tree – 2004
Stations – 2004

Compilations 
 "The Longer I Lay Here" (live) – Exploitation of Sound  Vol. 1 – Hero Music – 1999
 "Breadwinner You" – The Unaccompanied Voice: An A Capella Compilation – Secretly Canadian – 2000
 "Rapture", "Backwoods Nation" – Location Is Everything Vol. 1 – Jade Tree – 2002
 "I Do" (live) – Location Is Everything Vol. 2 – Jade Tree – 2004
 "Discretion" – "Take Action! Volume 04" – Sub City Records – 2004 
 "I Heard the Bells On Christmas Day" (new rendition) – Maybe This Christmas Tree – Nettwerk – 2004

Singles 

The band released various 45 rpm singles in limited quantities:

Personnel

Soundtracks 
The band is featured in the 2004 Christian music documentary Why Should the Devil Have All the Good Music?

References

External links 

Pedro the Lion official site
Jade Tree (record label)
Extensive feature article and interview with Fine Print Magazine
SuicideSqueeze.net

Suicide Squeeze Records artists
Indie rock musical groups from Washington (state)
Tooth & Nail Records artists
Musical groups from Seattle
Musical groups established in 1995
Musical groups disestablished in 2006
Musical groups reestablished in 2017
Jade Tree (record label) artists
Sadcore and slowcore groups
Emo musical groups from Washington (state)